The Torreya trap-door spider (Cyclocosmia torreya) is a species of spider in the family Halonoproctidae. It is endemic to the United States, and hitherto only known from along the Apalachicola River in Florida.

References

Halonoproctidae
Spiders of the United States
Endemic fauna of Florida
Least concern biota of the United States
Taxonomy articles created by Polbot